Jim Mabry (born 1966) is an American football player. He played on both offensive line and defensive line at Briarcrest Christian School in Memphis, Tennessee, from 1981-1985. He then attended the University of Arkansas and was an offensive lineman from 1985-1989. Following his senior season at Arkansas he was named a consensus All-American and appeared on the national Bob Hope Christmas special.

Mabry lettered with the Razorbacks from 1986 to 1989. Mabry earned All-Southwest Conference honors in 1988 and 1989 in addition to his All-America honors in 1989. Mabry anchored an offensive line that won back-to-back Southwest Conference titles and Cotton Bowl Classic appearances and helped the Hogs average 453 yards per game in offense. Mabry is also a member of the 1980s Razorback all-decade team.

Following his playing career, Mabry had his jersey retired (#56) at Briarcrest; he also served as the honorary captain for the Arkansas-Auburn football game on October 15, 2005. He now resides in Little Rock, Arkansas.

References

1966 births
Living people
All-American college football players
Arkansas Razorbacks football players
People from Memphis, Tennessee
People from Polk County, Arkansas
Sportspeople from Little Rock, Arkansas